Paradoxes of the Infinite (German title: Paradoxien des Unendlichen) is a mathematical work by Bernard Bolzano on the theory of sets. It was published by a friend and student, František Přihonský, in 1851, three years after Bolzano's death. 

The work contained many interesting results in set theory. Bolzano expanded on the theme of Galileo's paradox, giving more examples of correspondences between the elements of an infinite set and proper subsets of infinite sets. In the work he also explained the term Menge, rendered in English as "set", which he had coined and used in several works since the 1830s.

References

 Paradoxes of the Infinite; trans. by D.A.Steele; London: Routledge, 1950 
 (German original) 
 

History of mathematics
Infinity
Logic literature
Set theory
1851 essays
Works published posthumously